Richard Roy Cole (May 6, 1926 – October 18, 2018) was an American Major League Baseball infielder.

Before the  season, Cole was signed as an amateur free agent by the St. Louis Cardinals. Over eight years later, he made his debut with the Cardinals, but was traded after only 15 games of service to the Pittsburgh Pirates, where he would spend the majority of his career.

Cole was used at three different positions during his career, playing 169 games at shortstop, 118 games at second base, and 107 games at third.

In Cole's only full season, he grounded into 20 double plays, which was enough to tie for the second highest total in the National League with Stan Musial, only being topped by Del Ennis with 23. However, Cole hit .270, along with 22 doubles, 5 triples, and 40 RBI in 138 games. The only home run of the year he hit was off the Brooklyn Dodgers' All-Star Carl Erskine.

Cole died on October 18, 2018 at the age of 92.

References

Sources

1926 births
2018 deaths
Allentown Cardinals players
Baseball players from California
Chicago Cubs coaches
Columbus Red Birds players
Fresno Cardinals players
Hollywood Stars players
Houston Buffs players
Indianapolis Indians players
Major League Baseball second basemen
Major League Baseball shortstops
Major League Baseball third basemen
Milwaukee Braves players
Omaha Cardinals players
Pittsburgh Pirates players
Pittsburgh Pirates scouts
Rochester Red Wings players
Sacramento Solons players
St. Louis Cardinals players
San Francisco Giants scouts
Wichita Braves players
People from Long Beach, California